The Space Training and Readiness Delta (Provisional) (STAR Delta (P)) was a United States Space Force unit responsible for the training and education of space professionals, as well as the development of space warfighting doctrine. It was a component of Space Operations Command and was headquartered at Peterson Space Force Base, Colorado.

STAR Delta (P) was activated on 24 July 2020 to serve as the precursor organization to the planned Space Training and Readiness Command (STARCOM). Announced on 30 June 2020 as one of three field commands of the U.S. Space Force, STARCOM was set to be activated in 2021. In the interim, the delta was activated to provide oversight of Space Force education, training, and operational test and evaluation units. It was then inactivated on 23 August 2021 prior to the activation of STARCOM.

Structure in 2021

List of commanders

See also
 United States Air Force Academy
 Air Education and Training Command
 United States Army Training and Doctrine Command
 United States Marine Corps Training and Education Command
 Naval Education and Training Command
 Space Flag

References

Deltas of the United States Space Force
Military education and training in the United States